Meherbaan is a 1993 Indian Hindi-language film directed by K. Ravishankar, starring Mithun Chakraborty, Ayesha Jhulka, Shantipriya, Anupam Kher and Sadashiv Amrapurkar. The film was a remake of Tamil film Naan Pudicha Mappillai.

Plot
Meherbaan is the story of a family man, who has to decide between commitment, ethics and love between his two women.

Cast
Mithun Chakraborty as Ravi
Ayesha Jhulka as Chanda
Shantipriya as Neha
Sadashiv Amrapurkar as Chaurangilal
Anupam Kher as Shankar
Ajinkya Dev
Kader Khan as Biku
Sulbha Deshpande as Ravi's mother
Shobha Khote as special guest
Dina Pathak
Tina Ghai
Kalpana Iyer

Soundtrack 

The music of the film was composed by Dilip Sen-Sameer Sen and the lyrics were penned by Rani Malik, Mahendra Dehlvi, Maya Govind and Dilip Tahir. The Song "Agar Aasman Tak Mere Hath Jaate" is First Song Playback in Hindi Movie By Sonu Nigam. "Bol gori bol itni si baat" sung by Anuradha Paudwal and Ila Arun was a major hit.

References

External links
 

1993 films
1990s Hindi-language films
Mithun's Dream Factory films
Films shot in Ooty
Films scored by Dilip Sen-Sameer Sen
Hindi remakes of Tamil films